Savonlinnan Työväen Palloseura or STPS for short, is a football club located in Savonlinna, Finland. The club was founded in 1947. STPS has a strong labour movement background, "työväen palloseura" meaning "workers ball club" in Finnish.

This traditional club has 650 active members which makes STPS largest sport group in the city of Savonlinna.  The club hosts many youth and women's teams. The women's futsal team won the Finnish championship in 2005.

STPS is currently playing in South-Eastern Finland's Kolmonen (the 4th highest tier in the Finnish football system).

History

The men's team played under the name of Estura from 1979 to 1980 and under the name FC Savonlinna in the 1990s.  The club has enjoyed 9 seasons in the Kakkonen (Second Division), the third tier of Finnish Football, in 1974–75, 1977–80, 1991 and 1994–1995.

Season to season

Club Structure

STPS run 2 men's teams, a men's veterans team and 9 boys teams.  In addition the Mertalan Pallo, Karvilan Kivekkäät, FC Anttola and Rantasalmen Urheilijat clubs form part of the STPS structure.  The club also run a Nappulaliiga for youngsters.

2010 season

STPS Men's Team are competing in the Kolmonen (Third Division) administered by the Kaakkois-Suomi SPL.  This is the fourth highest tier in the Finnish football system. In 2009 STPS finished in fifth place in the Kolmonen.

STPS/2 are participating in the Nelonen (Fourth Division) administered by the Kaakkois-Suomi SPL. In 2009 they were promoted from North Section of the Vitonen.

References and sources
Official Website
First Team Website
Finnish Wikipedia
Suomen Cup
 STPS-edustus Facebook

Footnotes

Football clubs in Finland
Savonlinna
1947 establishments in Finland
Association football clubs established in 1947